Syed Mohammad Ahmed credited as  Mohammad Ahmed is a Pakistani screenwriter, lyricist, actor, and director. He is best known for Mystery Theater, Badtameez, Tum Se Kehna tha, Shaista Shaista, Azar Ki Ayegi Baraat, Annie Ki Ayegi Baraat, Tanhaiyan Naye Silsilay, Dareecha, Goya, and many other serials and telefilms such as Khamoshi, Ghoongat and Ramchand Pakistani. His appearance as Agha Jan in Suno Chanda was praised by critics and he went on to reprise his role in its sequel Suno Chanda 2. He also wrote dialogue for the Indian movie Tere Bin Laden. He has penned down several lyrics for television serials. In 2019, he receives nomination for Best Actor for Cake at 18th Lux Style Awards.

Career
His body of work is a showcase of the storyteller's art. The humor in his scripts is real. He never exaggerates the subject and uses real-life humor. One can see an undercurrent of social issues in his screenplays but with the treatment, laced with humor. He is fascinated in the satirical way Mushtaq Ahmad Yusufi dealt with serious issues. Desi Rants n Raves wrote "Mohammed Ahmed is a seasoned writer and his flair for penning relatable and real stories is on full display in most of his work. With no black or white extremes, a simple story on the surface, his script appears to have layers of meaning embedded within crisp and meaningful dialogues." He also acted in various drama serials including Ehd E Wafa, Suno Chanda, Mere Paas Tum Ho, Aulaad and Sabaat. His performance in these serials is widely praised by viewers and critics.

Filmography

Film

Television

Screenwriting

References

External links
 

Pakistani film actors
Pakistani television directors
Pakistani screenwriters
Living people
1957 births